Idylwild Wildlife Management Area is a Wildlife Management Area in Caroline County, Maryland near Federalsburg. The  area is bounded on the west by Marshyhope Creek, with areas of wetlands.

References

External links
 Idylwild Wildlife Management Area

Wildlife management areas of Maryland
Protected areas of Caroline County, Maryland